Events of the year 2019 in Armenia.

Incumbents
President: Armen Sarkissian
Prime Minister: Nikol Pashinyan
Speaker: Ara Babloyan (until 14 January), Ararat Mirzoyan (from 14 January)

Events

January 
January 14 – The Second Pashinyan government is formed

July 
14–27 July – The 2019 UEFA European Under-19 Championship

October 
6–9 October – World Congress On Information Technology (WCIT) 2019

Births

Deaths

References

 
Years of the 21st century in Armenia
Armenia
Armenia
Armenia
2010s in Armenia